Chiang Rai Witthayakhom School (RTGS), locally spelled as Chiengrai Vidhayakhome School, is a school in Chiang Rai city. It is the oldest school in Chiang Rai Province, Northern Thailand and one of the oldest schools in Thailand.

History
In 1888 Daniel McGilvary, an American missionary of Scottish origin and founder of the Laos Mission, established a church house and a school in Chiang Saen District, Chiang Rai Province, which he named "Boys School". This school was located near the banks of the Kok River, close to the confluence with the Mekong. After less than twenty years this school was moved to Chiang Rai city, to its present location near the Overbrook Hospital.

In 1914 missionaries of the Presbyterian Church in the United States took over the management. The school used to give education exclusively to boys until 1927, when girls were admitted. In 1934 it was renamed "Christian Witthayakhom School" after having been merged with a certain girls' school that had also been founded by Christian missionaries.

In 1941, during World War II and the Japanese invasion of Thailand, Christianity was considered the "religion of the enemies": the Allies of World War II. As a result, all Christian missionary activity was terminated. Following the departure of the foreign missionaries the school's management was handed over to the provincial government and the education officer of the province, Wisit Reungkamphon, became its owner and director.

In 1953, eight years after the war, the school reestablished Christian education led by the Church of Christ in Thailand, the oldest Protestant umbrella organization in Thailand. It was renamed Chiengrai Vidhayakhome School, which gave the school the acronym CVK that it uses nowadays.

A street divides the northern and the southern wing of the school. Additions and changes had been made to the buildings along the years until most of them were demolished in 1996 and new buildings were erected. The oldest building stands in the northern wing of the school.

Administration
The school is run by the Foundation of the Church of Christ in Thailand.

The manager is Sathaphon Limphadung. The administrative offices, a meeting room and a larger conference room are in the office building in the southern section of the school.

Campus
The classroom buildings have a total of 74 classrooms. The compound includes an office building, a swimming pool, playgrounds, two dining halls and a cafeteria.

The school has a library and a stationery store, as well as two health care facilities, one in the northern wing and the other in the southern.

Within the school compound there is also a large auditorium where concerts and plays regularly take place. For high-profile performances, it is open to the public.

See also
Christianity in Thailand
Education in Thailand
Protestantism in Thailand
Church of Christ in Thailand
Laos Mission
Daniel McGilvary

Gallery

2012 Sports Day parade

References

External links

CVK Official page
 CVK Facebook page
Alumni Page
CVK Opening
CVK celebration
CVK students activities
CVK students talk
CVK sports day 2013

Buildings and structures in Chiang Rai province
Christian schools in Thailand
Presbyterianism in Thailand
Education in Chiang Rai province
Educational institutions established in 1888
1888 establishments in Siam